Zen Habits is a blog written by Leo Babauta about implementing zen habits in daily life. It offers suggestions for how to live and also includes frequent references to how Leo Babauta has implemented these habits. He covers topics such as simplifying, living frugally, parenting, happiness, motivation, eliminating debt, saving, eating healthily and successfully implementing good habits.

Blog history
Until approximately 2010, the blog focused largely on topics such as productivity and being organized, but Babauta later drifted away from these topics. In a post titled "Toss Productivity Out", published 6 September 2011, Babauta explicitly encouraged his readers to focus on simplifying their lives rather than getting more things done.

About Leo Babauta
Zen Habits was created by Leo Babauta (born April 30, 1973), a blogger, journalist and author from the United States territory of Guam who currently lives in Davis, CA. Babauta's first post was on February 1, 2007. In February 2009, Time Magazine named Zen Habits one of the Top 25 Blogs for 2009, and in June 2010, it named Zen Habits at the top of its list for the Top 25 Blogs for 2010.

e-book
On November 6, 2007, an e-book called Zen To Done: The Ultimate Simple Productivity System was made available to purchase.  It is composed of some of Zen Habits' popular blog posts. On January 7, 2008, the Zen Habits blog and Zen to Done e-book were dedicated to the public domain. Babauta also published The Little Book of Contentment in 2013.

Books
On December 30, 2008, Babauta's first print book, The Power of Less, was published by Hyperion Books.

In December 2014, Babauta self-published a book that was funded on Kickstarter, entitled Zen Habits: Mastering the Art of Change. In December 2015, he revised and re-published a concise version of the book as "Essential Zen Habits".

References

External links
 Zen Habits
 Zen To Done: The Ultimate Simple Productivity System by Leo Babauta
 Leo Babauta's bio
 Leo Babauta's personal site
 The Power of Less website
 mnmlist
 Zen Habits in audio form

American blogs
Internet properties established in 2007
Communications in Guam